Angela Maria Diniz Gonçalves (born December 5, 1949), best known by the stage name Angela Ro Ro, based on an onomatopoeia of her laughter, is a Brazilian singer-songwriter influenced by her idols Ella Fitzgerald, Maysa Matarazzo and Jacques Brel.

Her debut album was voted by Rolling Stone Brazil one of the greatest Brazilian albums of all time.

She was one of the first lesbian singers in Brazil to reveal herself as a lesbian.

Discography 
Angela Ro Ro (1979)
Só Nos Resta Viver (1980)
Escândalo! (1981)
Simples Carinho (1982)
A Vida é Mesmo Assim (1984)
Eu Desatino (1984)
Prova De Amor (1988)
Ao Vivo (1993)
Acertei No Milênio (2000)
Compasso (2006)
Ao Vivo (2006)
Escândalo (2009)
Feliz da Vida! (2013)

References

External links
 Angela Ro Ro (official website)

1949 births
Living people
20th-century Brazilian women singers
20th-century Brazilian singers
Musicians from Rio de Janeiro (city)
Lesbian musicians
Brazilian LGBT singers
Música Popular Brasileira singers
20th-century LGBT people
21st-century LGBT people
21st-century Brazilian women singers
21st-century Brazilian singers
LGBT people in Latin music
Women in Latin music